Maurice Maximilian Malone (born 17 August 2000) is a German professional footballer who plays as a centre-forward for Austrian Bundesliga club Wolfsberger AC, on loan from FC Augsburg.

Club career
Malone made his professional debut for Wehen Wiesbaden in the first round of the 2020–21 DFB-Pokal on 13 September 2020, coming on as a substitute in the 75th minute for Sebastian Mrowca against 2. Bundesliga side 1. FC Heidenheim. The home match finished as a 1–0 win for Wiesbaden.

On 30 August 2021, Malone joined 2. Bundesliga club 1. FC Heidenheim on loan until the end of the season.

International career
Born in Germany, Malone is of American descent. He is a youth international for Germany.

References

External links
 
 
 
 
 

2000 births
Living people
German people of American descent
Sportspeople from Augsburg
Footballers from Bavaria
German footballers
Association football forwards
Germany youth international footballers
Germany under-21 international footballers
American soccer players
FC Augsburg II players
FC Augsburg players
SV Wehen Wiesbaden players
Wolfsberger AC players
1. FC Heidenheim players
2. Bundesliga players
3. Liga players
Regionalliga players
Austrian Football Bundesliga players
German expatriate footballers
Expatriate footballers in Austria
German expatriate sportspeople in Austria